Melanie Roberts is a British gymnast.

Melanie Roberts may also refer to:

Melanie Roberts, see Tameside Council election, 2007
Melanie Roberts, character in Village of the Damned (1995 film)

See also
Mel Roberts (disambiguation)